Edgecliff may refer to:

United States
 Edgecliff (Cincinnati, Ohio), historic building
 Edgecliff (Southwest Harbor, Maine), historic building
 Edgecliff (Winnetka, Illinois), historic building
 Edgecliff College, defunct women's private catholic college
 Edgecliff Village, Texas

Australia
 Edgecliff, New South Wales
 Edgecliff railway station

See also
Kinver High School (formerly Edgecliff High School)